Hokishe Sema (6 March 1921 – 31 January 2007) was an Indian politician who served as the third Chief Minister of Nagaland and the fourth Governor of Himachal Pradesh. He was also a member of the drafting committee of Naga People's Convention.

Early life 

Sema was born on 6 March 1921 in the Sütemi village in the erstwhile Naga Hills District (present-day Zünheboto District of Nagaland). He studied in Mokokchung Government School before proceeding to Serampore College and St Anthony's College in Shillong. He joined government service in the 1950s as a school inspector, later serving as an assistant commissioner of the then Naga Hills district of undivided Assam.

Political career 
In the late 1950s, he became a member of the drafting committee of Naga People's Convention. A sixteen-point agreement signed with the Government of India on the basis of this Convention led to the formation of the separate state of Nagaland in 1960. Sema became a member of the interim body of the new state government in 1961.

In 1964, Sema was elected unchallenged to the first legislative assembly of the newly-formed Nagaland state from Akuluto constituency. He served as the cabinet minister in the state governments headed by P. Shilu Ao and T. N. Angami.

In 1967, Sema was one of the two politicians inducted to the Home Mission Board of the Nagaland Baptist Church Church Council when it was reconstituted.

Chief Minister of Nagaland 

After the elections to the Second Legislative Assembly (1969-1974), the Naga Nationalist Organisation won 22 of the total 40 seats for which elections were conducted, 12 seats from Tuensang Area were nominated from the region. Eventually, the 12 nominated members as well as eight Independent members lent support to the NNO on 12 February raising the strength of the NNO to 41. Thereby, Sema who was elected the leader of the NNO legislative party was sworn in as the third Chief Minister of Nagaland by the governor Braj Kumar Nehru. During his term, two no-confidence motions were moved against him. Both, however, were defeated.

He lost his seat to Rano M. Shaiza in 1977. In the 1980s he was the leader of the Congress (I). In 1986 he became Chief Minister for brief period.

Sema's tenure as chief minister is remembered for the role he played in getting Naga underground members to surrender and their subsequent integration and redeployment as a full battalion of the Border Security Force. From 1969 to 1974 and 1982–1987, his government provided Nagaland with a measure of political stability.

Later political career 

He joined the Indian National Congress in late 70's, the first national party to set up a unit in Nagaland. He was elected to the Nagaland Legislative Assembly six times during which time he also served as the Finance Minister of the state and as the president of the Nagaland Pradesh Congress Committee.

From April 1983 to March 1986 he served as Governor of Himachal Pradesh and was later a member of the Rajya Sabha.

In 1994, he left the Indian National Congress owing to differences with the chief minister, S C Jamir and formed the Nationalist Democratic Movement.

Association with the Bharatiya Janata Party 
He joined the Bharatiya Janata Party in 1999 and went on to become that party's national executive member.

In 2003 he was re-elected to the Nagaland Legislative Assembly as the Bharatiya Janata Party candidate from Dimapur-I constituency. He became leader of the BJP's legislature party and chairman of the ruling Democratic Alliance of Nagaland with Neiphiu Rio as Chief Minister.

He authored The Emergence of Nagaland in 1986.

Death 
Hokishe Sema died on 31 January 2007 of cardiac arrest. He was suffering from old age ailments and was admitted to hospital. He was buried with state honours in his native village of Sutemi. He was survived by his late wife at that time, five sons and a daughter.

References 

Bharatiya Janata Party politicians from Nagaland
Chief Ministers of Nagaland
2007 deaths
Rajya Sabha members from Nagaland
Governors of Himachal Pradesh
People from Zünheboto district
Chief ministers from Indian National Congress
Indian National Congress politicians from Nagaland
St. Paul's Cathedral Mission College alumni
Nagaland MLAs 1964–1969
Nagaland MLAs 1969–1974
Nagaland MLAs 1982–1987
Nagaland MLAs 1987–1988
1921 births
Nagaland MLAs 2003–2008